GDSC may refer to:

 Genome Damage and Stability Centre, a Medical Research Council institute at the University of Sussex
 Government Data Standards Catalogue, a catalogue of UK Government data standards, part of e-GIF
 Gulf Diabetes Specialist Center, a medical center in Bahrain